Lake Huangqi, also known by its Chinese name as the Huangqi Hai, is a lake in Chahar Right Front Banner, Ulanqab Prefecture, Inner Mongolia, China.

Name
The present name dates to the Qing, when it was named after one of the Eight Banners.

Geography
Lake Huangqi is a lake in Chahar Right Front Banner, Ulanqab Prefecture, Inner Mongolia, China.

History
Under the Qin, Huangqi and Dai lakes formed the northern boundaries of Yanmen Commandery, marking part of the northern frontier of the Chinese empire.

References

Citations

Bibliography
 .

External links

Huangqi
Huangqi